Let's All Go to the Lobby (officially known as Technicolor Refreshment Trailer No. 1) is a 1957 animated musical advertisement played in theaters before the beginning of the main film or before intermission, featuring animated food items urging the audience to buy snacks sold in the theater lobby. It was produced for Filmack Studios and directed by Dave Fleischer.

Filmack has continued selling copies in the decades since its production. The company estimates that 80% of independent theaters have screened the film at various points, and it is likely the most viewed snipe.

In 2000, Let's All Go to the Lobby was selected for preservation in the United States National Film Registry by the Library of Congress as being "culturally, historically, or aesthetically significant".

Content 
The film consists of six shots. The most recognizable of these depicts four animated food items (from left to right: candy bar, popcorn, candy, and a soft drink) singing and walking leftwards. In the foreground before these characters are silhouettes of audience members, creating an illusion of depth, a standard technique of the medium. In a later shot, a group of four consumers are depicted enjoying their purchased food items.

The eponymous song of the film is set to the same tune as "We Won't Be Home Until Morning", "The Bear Went Over the Mountain", "For He's a Jolly Good Fellow", and "Marlbrough s'en va-t-en guerre". While the origins of the melody are lost,  it was already well-enough known in the early 19th century to be used for a passage in Wellington's Victory (1813) by Ludwig van Beethoven.

Daniel Eagan argues that "[w]ith its simple, repetitive lyrics and streamlined animation, Let's All Go to the Lobby has a hypnotic pull that is as compelling today as it was fifty years ago." He also notes that by choosing not to simply photograph the offered items, the creators of the film avoided using brand names for the products for sale.

Background and history
The Chicago-based Filmack Studios, originally known as Filmack Trailer Company, was founded in 1919 by Irving Mack. The company specialized in the production of newsreels and promotional material for theaters. The film is technically known as a snipe, which is defined as material displayed on a projection screen without being part of the featured presentation. This includes advertising material, previews of coming attractions, courtesy requests for the audience, and notices concerning the concession stand of the movie theater. By the 1950s, the sales of the concession stands represented a significant portion of movie theaters' revenue. Filmack commissioned a series of Technicolor trailers aimed at informing audiences about a theater's newly installed concession stand. Let's All Go to the Lobby was one of these films.

The trailer was animated by Dave Fleischer and produced by Filmack Studios. Fleischer was identified as the creator of this short film in a list of Filmack's releases which reported that "Both trailers were produced exclusively for Filmack by Dave Fleischer..."

Specific details for his involvement are lacking, and the rest of the production crew remains unknown. Production may have started by 1953, but Robbie Mack (a later owner of Filmack) estimates it was completed . The release date is typically estimated to 1957. The original production records are considered lost. Filmack sold to various theater owners the right to use the film, which it still owns.

The lyrics were written by Jack Tillar.

In popular culture 
The clip of the singing concessions has frequently been parodied in advertisements of the 2000s. These include a 2006 spot for Chipotle Mexican Grill where a burrito attempts to join the characters, a 2011 spot for the Tribeca Film Festival where the characters are mobsters voiced by the cast of The Sopranos, and a 2013 GEICO commercial where the characters are chided for speaking on their cell phones. It has also been spoofed in popular entertainment including Late Show with David Letterman, 2 Stupid Dogs, The Simpsons,  The Lego Movie 2: The Second Part, and the Adult Swim film Aqua Teen Hunger Force Colon Movie Film for Theaters. It also appears in fictional depictions of theaters. Lionsgate produced a quarantine-themed version of the snipe to accompany special presentations of films streamed online during the COVID-19 pandemic.

Footnotes

Notes

References

Sources

External links

Let's All Go to the Lobby essay by animation historian Thad Komorowski on the National Film Registry website 
Let's All Go to the Lobby at Filmack

1957 films
1957 animated films
1957 short films
1950s American animated films
1950s animated short films
United States National Film Registry films
Films set in a movie theatre
Audiovisual ephemera
Short films directed by Dave Fleischer
Food advertising characters
1950s neologisms
Quotations from film
Quotations from music
Quotations from animation
American advertising slogans
1950s English-language films